The 1997–98 Alabama Crimson Tide men's basketball team represented the University of Alabama in the 1997–98 NCAA Division I men's basketball season. The team's head coach was David Hobbs, who was in his sixth, and final season at Alabama.  The team played their home games at Coleman Coliseum in Tuscaloosa, Alabama. They finished the season with a record of 15–16, with a conference record of 6–10, which placed them in fourth place in the SEC Western Division.

The Tide defeated Vanderbilt in the first round of the 1997 SEC men's basketball tournament, but lost to Kentucky in the quarterfinal.  The Tide did not an invite to a postseason tournament, meaning the Tide had missed the postseason for a second consecutive season.

Following the season, head coach David Hobbs resigned from his position, finishing with a 110–76 (59.4%) career record and producing nine All-SEC players. As his replacement, Murray State head coach Mark Gottfried was hired on March 25, 1998.

Roster

Schedule and results

|-
!colspan=14 style=| Regular Season

|-
!colspan=9 style=| SEC Tournament

Sources

References 

Alabama Crimson Tide men's basketball seasons
Alabama
1997 in sports in Alabama
1998 in sports in Alabama